Maharashtra has an extensive mountain range running parallel to its 750 km long coastline. This range is geographically part of the Sahyadris or the Western Ghats which forms a crest along the western edge. of the Deccan plateau separating it from the coastal Konkan belt. Throughout its extent it bears some renowned peaks, hill stations and valleys. Parts of the western ghats has been designated as the Hottest Biodiversity Hotspots.

List of mountain peaks
Following is the list of some notable peaks:

(This list is highly inaccurate in terms of ranks)

References

Mountain peaks
Maharashtra
Maharashtra